No. 116 (Bomber Reconnaissance) Squadron was a Royal Canadian Air Force squadron that was active during the Second World War. It was originally formed as a Coast Artillery Co-operation squadron and then a fighter squadron before being disbanded in 1939, and then reformed in 1941. It was primarily used in an anti-submarine role and was based at Dartmouth and Sydney, Nova Scotia and Gander, Newfoundland. The squadron flew the Catalina and Canso before disbanding on 20 June 1945.

See also
 RCAF Eastern Air Command

References

Royal Canadian Air Force squadrons (disbanded)
Military units and formations of Canada in World War II